Chaudhry Fazal ur Rehman is a Pakistani politician who was a Member of the Provincial Assembly of the Punjab, from 1997 to 1999 and again from May 2013 to May 2018.

Early life and education
He was born on 15 June 1961 in Multan.

He has received Intermediate education.

Political career
He ran for the seat of the Provincial Assembly of the Punjab as a candidate of Pakistan Muslim League (N) (PML-N) from Constituency PP-176 (Khanewal-III) in 1993 Pakistani general election but was unsuccessful. He received 26,885 votes and lost the seat to Sardar Allah Yar Hiraj, a candidate of Pakistan Peoples Party (PPP).

He was elected to the Provincial Assembly of the Punjab as a candidate of PML-N from Constituency PP-176 (Khanewal-III) in 1997 Pakistani general election. He secured 27,064 votes and defeated Sardar Allah Yar Hiraj, a candidate of PPP.

He was re-elected to the Provincial Assembly of the Punjab as a candidate of PML-N from Constituency PP-215 (Khanewal-IV) in 2013 Pakistani general election. He received 45,039 votes and defeated Ahmad Yar Hiraj, a candidate of Pakistan Muslim League (Q) (PML-Q).

References

Living people
Punjab MPAs 2013–2018
1961 births
Pakistan Muslim League (N) politicians
Punjab MPAs 1997–1999